William Franklin Senn (July 14, 1905 – September 1973) was a professional American football running back in the National Football League. He played eight seasons for the Chicago Bears, the Brooklyn Dodgers, and the Cincinnati Reds/St. Louis Gunners.

1905 births
1973 deaths
American football running backs
Knox Prairie Fire football players
Chicago Bears players
Brooklyn Dodgers (NFL) players
Cincinnati Reds (NFL) players
St. Louis Gunners players
People from Macomb, Illinois
Players of American football from Illinois